Angel of the Lord 2 is a 2016 Czech fantasy comedy film directed by Jiří Strach. The movie is available on Voyo.cz with Czech audio. It is a sequel to Strach's 2005 film, Angel of the Lord.

Plot
It is Saint Nicholas Day, and angel Petronel still works at the gates of Heaven. He believes he is entitled to a better post, however. His old accomplice, the devil Uriáš, tempts him to pick an apple from the tree of knowledge. As the two argue, the precious fruit falls to Earth, and God sends the inept duo down to retrieve it. On Earth, they meet little Anežka and her beautiful mother, a crew of deceitful carolers, the greedy Košťál, and a likeable sausage seller. Before they can find the apple and bring it back to Heaven, the two are subjected to an adventure that involves a number of perils.

Cast and characters
 Ivan Trojan as angel Petronel
 Jiří Dvořák as devil Uriáš
 Vica Kerekes as the widow Magdalena
 Anna Čtvrtníčková as Anežka
 Viktor Preiss as judge
 Pavel Liška as fake devil
 Stanislav Majer as fake Saint Nicholas
 Marek Taclík as fake angel
 Vojtěch Dyk as sausage seller
 Marián Labuda as confectioner
 Jiří Bartoška as God
 Klára Issová as the Virgin Mary
 Bolek Polívka as tailor Košťál
 Viktor Antonio as Jesus
 Josef Abrhám as Saint Joseph
 Jiří Pecha as Saint Nicholas
 Veronika Žilková as Saint Veronica
 Martin Huba as Saint Martin
 Petr Čtvrtníček as Saint Peter
 Gabriela Osvaldová as Archangel Gabriel
 Michal Horáček as Archangel Michael
 Matěj Hádek as Saint Matthias
 Lucie Bílá as Saint Lucy
 Boni Pueri as angels
 Jiřina Bohdalová as the soul of Mrs. Voříšková
 Roman Luknár as the soul of King Herodes

Reception
The film broke the box office record for a Czech film at US$4.9 million as of 6 February 2017.

See also
 List of films about angels

References

External links
 

Czech fantasy films
Czech children's films
Czech comedy films
Czech sequel films
Films based on fairy tales
Films about angels
2010s Christmas films
2010s Czech-language films